Paul Steiger (born August 15, 1942) is an American journalist who served as managing editor of The Wall Street Journal from 1991 until May 15, 2007. After that, he was the founding editor-in-chief, CEO and president of ProPublica from 2008 through 2012.

Steiger was born in the Bronx to a Catholic family and grew up in Stamford, Connecticut, and Princeton, New Jersey. He graduated from the Hun School of Princeton and was a member of Trumbull College at Yale University, where he was an editor of the Yale News and Review and a member of Manuscript Society. He worked for the Los Angeles Times from 1966 to 1983.

He is currently the executive chairman of ProPublica.  He chaired the Committee to Protect Journalists and has won numerous journalism awards.

He is a member of the Council on Foreign Relations.

Awards

 1974 Gerald Loeb Award for Large Newspapers for "Use by Some Banks of Loan Loopholes Worries Regulators"
 1978 Gerald Loeb Award for Large Newspapers for "The Dollar: Its History and Current Woes"
 2002 Gerald Loeb Lifetime Achievement Award

References 

1942 births
Living people
American male journalists
Hun School of Princeton alumni
The Wall Street Journal people
Yale University alumni
American nonprofit chief executives
Los Angeles Times people
People from the Bronx
Writers from Stamford, Connecticut
People from Princeton, New Jersey
20th-century American journalists
Gerald Loeb Award winners for Large Newspapers
Gerald Loeb Lifetime Achievement Award winners